Sons of Provo is a 2004 film written by Peter Brown and Will Swenson, and directed by Will Swenson.  It is a mockumentary that portrays the experience of an LDS boy band named Everclean from formation to resounding success.

Sons of Provo made its official premiere at the inaugural SpudFest Family Film and Music Festival 2004 in Driggs, Idaho with Will Swenson, Kirby Heyborne, Danny Tarasevich, and Peter Brown present for the premiere.

Plot

Will and Danny Jensen are brothers, and the film begins with an interview with their parents.  They talk about Will and Danny's youth-pageant championships and their singing abilities.  Will and Danny's parents can't sing, as their poor attempt shows.

Will Jensen (Will Swensen) is an aerobics instructor and is popular with women (the blonde he is constantly seen with is a different girl on camera each time. He sees the band as his.  Kirby later says that Will is near controlling, but not quite.

Danny Jensen (Danny Tarasevich) is an ice hockey player and has a life philosophy that is a fusion of Buddhism and Mormonism.  His introductory interviews are done in front of posters of Ozzy Osbourne and Donny & Marie.  Whenever he has a moral dilemma, he thinks, "What Would Donny & Marie Do?" (WWD&MD).

Will and Danny Jensen are the remaining members of an LDS boy-band from Provo, Utah that recently lost its third member because of "artistic reasons." Will and Danny begin the search for a new third member of their band that does not yet have a name.

They begin by posting flyers and holding auditions in their own house.  After that fails, they start searching local plays and baseball games (for singers of the national anthem).  They eventually decide on the star of a production of Forever Plaid at a local community theatre.  He turns them down without reservation.  They then do an impromptu try-out of one of the costars, Kirby Laybourne (Kirby Heyborne), and recruit him for the group.  Kirby is a scrapbooking specialist who works at Daisy Cutter Scrapbooking Company.  His CTR ring is his most important possession.

The group needs a manager, so Will and Danny hire their nephew (who is older), Grayson Jensen (Peter Brown), for the job.  The first gig he books for them is as the targets of a pie-throwing booth at a local fair.  They sing while pies are being thrown at them.  They are not pleased with their manager.

Their second gig is at a local wedding reception in a church gymnasium.  The gymnasium is partitioned off so that half is for the wedding reception.  When they begin to perform, one of the microphone stands collapses.  A boy scout troop begins to shoot hoops in the other end of the gymnasium.  Kirby turns up the music to overpower the sounds of the basketball playing and causes feedback.  The bride and groom then begin to argue and the bride walks out.  Then the group ends their performance and argues vociferously with their manager during which the manager uses the words "fetchers", "flippin'", "heck" and "butt".  Will tells him, "Watch your language!"

In the next scene, Will says, "I, for one, am fine with the fact that we had to let Grayson go.  There is a certain level of conduct that is expected from a boy-band's manager.  I know that Justin Timberlake's manager doesn't throw out language like that."  At the next official group meeting, the first order of business is to find a new manager.  The band ends up hiring an old girlfriend of Kirby's who works at Provo Theatre Company, Jill Keith (Jennifer Erekson).

Meanwhile, Will has set up their next gig to perform at a local fireside.  Will splurges and purchases headmikes that are "the same model as Jessica Simpson used at her last two mall appearances."  One of the men who hears them there has a recording studio in his house and offers to record their music so he asks, "What's your band's name?"  They hold a brainstorming session in a park and come up with the name "Everkleen" (eventually shifting to the spelling, "Everclean.")

They decide that they need to hire a professional choreographer, a local ballet instructor, Yvonne Bolschweiler (Maureen Eastwood).  She insists on them working hard without backtalking.

After recording their first album, they begin to get some paying gigs.  It doesn't take long until they have a tour starting in Salt Lake City, Utah and including Logan, Utah; Salem, Utah; and Moscow, Idaho.  During their tour, the reservations that they had made for the Days Inn in St. George, Utah had been lost and, "There's no room in the inn." They camp out that night on the Red Hill in Utah, with a short campfire song named "I Am Called Buttercup." This is the first concert where they let Kirby sing lead vocal, in the song "Spiritchal as Me".

Some time after this performance, they read a review in the newspaper which pans their performance.  It was written with such highbrow words that they think that it is a good review.

At a performance at Utah State University, Kirby loses his CTR ring down a drain just before a performance.  In one of the earlier interviews, he conveys how important it is to him.  He can be seen clearly performing below par.  During the performance, the band manager gets someone to take the drain apart and retrieve the ring, which she returns to Kirby during the performance.

One of the songs that they perform in their concerts is titled "Dang, Fetch, Oh my Heck"  It starts out with the lyrics, "Dang! Fetch! Oh my Heck! What the holy scrud? / H-E double hockey sticks! That's frickin' flippin' crud!"  Their former band manager, Grayson, who is at the performance walks out calling them hypocrites, and saying some other near-profanities.

Their next performance is at the Jensen family reunion.  It will be the first time since the band has seen Grayson since he was fired.  When they encounter each other, they are cordial.  Everclean performs to some applause.  Then Grayson introduces the singing group that he has been managing for the past few months, moosebutter (an actual a cappella comedy group) who performs to wild applause.

The Everclean tour ends up at Centerville High School (Provo, Utah), where the Jensen brothers went to high school.  While practicing for the performance, Will doesn't appreciate that a high school junior is managing the technical aspects instead of a senior.  This escalates in to an argument between the band members from which they all walk away.  The band manager talks to Will and convinces him to listen to the tape that Kirby has made of the song that he wrote and wants to perform.  Will then apologizes to Danny.  They both call up Kirby who is listening as they leave a message on his answering machine.  Will and Danny are practicing Kirby's song just before the performance not knowing if Kirby will show up.

He does show up, and Will admits that the group can't get along without Kirby.  The last scene is a performance of Kirby's song by Everclean, with Will and Danny singing backup.

Featured cast

Will Swenson as Will Jensen
Kirby Heyborne as Kirby Laybourne
Danny Tarasevich as Danny Jensen
Jennifer Erekson as Jill Keith
Peter D. Brown as Grayson Jensen
Maureen Eastwood as Yvonne Bolschweiler

Production notes
The actors who portray Everclean actually sing their songs in the movie.  While filming, they also toured and performed as Everclean. The name Everclean is a riff on the successful three-guy rock band, Everclear, who get their name from the infamous high-proof grain alcohol.

In the beginning of the film, Will and Danny post audition flyers with the callback number "867-5309," a reference to the popular song by Tommy Tutone.

During the end credits, some scenes are shown that were cut from the main film.  The largest part is from a fictional television program called "Good Morning Taylorsville".

Soundtrack

The soundtrack for the film contains the full-length versions of the songs that they sing in the movie.  Each of the songs have tunes like popular boy-bands, from pop to rap.  The lyrics are tongue-in-cheek, light-hearted jabs about the LDS culture.  All of the songs are written by Will Swenson, except for the final one which was written by Kirby Heyborne, reflecting the authorship by the characters in the film.

 Everclean
 Word of Wizzum
 Love Me, But Don't Show Me
 Diddly Wack Mack Mormon Daddy
 Wait For Me
 Spiritchal as Me
 Sweet Spirit
 Nourish and Strengthen
 Dang, Fetch, Oh My Heck
 Beautiful Inside

References

External links

 LDS Film's Sons of Provo page of reviews and links

2004 films
Mormon cinema
American mockumentary films
Halestorm Entertainment films
2000s English-language films
2000s American films